The New South Wales Amateur Championship is the state amateur golf championship of New South Wales, Australia. It was first played in 1898.

History
In early 1898 Lord Hampden, the Governor of New South Wales, presented a solid silver cup to the Royal Sydney and The Australian golf clubs. The two clubs agreed that the cup would be presented to the winner of a 72-hole bogey competition, with 36 holes played on each of the two courses, and be regarded as the amateur championship of New South Wales. Entry was restricted to members of New South Wales clubs. The 1898 championship was won by Hugh MacNeil who finished 14 holes ahead of the runner-up Ted Simpson. MacNeil won again in 1899, this time by an even wider margin, 19 holes, over Simpson. MacNeil was absent in 1900 and the championship was won by Edward Bayly Macarthur by a single hole from Simpson. Simpson won for the first time in 1901, 5 holes ahead of MacNeil, and retained the title in 1902, by 3 holes from Macarthur.

In early 1903 it was decided to separate the Hampden Cup from the New South Wales Amateur Championship. The Hampden Cup would remain a scratch bogey competition for members of the two clubs, while the NSW Amateur Championship would be organised later in the year, as a match-play event. It was agreed that the 1903 NSW Amateur would be played at The Australian Golf Club in October. There would be a 36-hole stroke-play stage after which the leading 8 amateurs would play 36-hole match-play. The stroke-play stage would be run as a separate competition with entry open to professionals as well as amateurs. Amateurs and professionals from outside New South Wales were able to compete. The open event was seen as a preliminary to the establishment of an Australian Open. An amateur, Dan Soutar, won the open competition by two strokes from Carnegie Clark, followed by five other professionals. Soutar finished 15 strokes ahead of the other amateurs. He went on to win the NSW Amateur, beating Henry Gritton 10&8 in the final.

Dan Soutar retained the title in 1904, beating Richmond Whytt 12&11 in the final, having dominated the event. The qualifying stage was for amateurs only and was played in very difficult conditions, with the Saturday afternoon round postponed to the following Monday. Soutar led the qualifying, having scored 91 in the first round, the only player to break 100. He beat Hugh MacNeil 6&4 in the first round and then Frank Hargreaves 15&14 in the semi-final. There was no championship in 1905, with The Australian Golf Club, which had hosted the event in 1903 and 1904, in the process of moving from Botany to Kensington. The organisation of golf in the state was in a period of change with the New South Wales Golf Council being formed in late 1905, initially without Royal Sydney, who joined in 1906. Royal Sydney was then chosen to host the 1906 championship, the first under the control of the NSW Golf Council. The format from 1904 was retained with 8 qualifiers. Soutar having turned professional, the championship saw two new finalists, Oscar O'Brien and Tom Cheadle, O'Brien winning 5&3.

The 1907 championship was at Royal Sydney, the number of qualifiers being increased to 16. A trophy was given to the leading player in qualifying, although if that player went on to win the championship, the trophy was given to the runner-up in the qualifying. Oscar O'Brien led the qualifying, but the final was contested between Ted Simpson and 18-year-old Eric Apperly. Simpson won at the 37th hole. The 1908 event was held on the new course of The Australian Golf Club at Kensington and resulted in a second success for O'Brien. A new format was tried in 1909 with a 72-hole qualifying event, 36 holes at Royal Sydney and 36 at The Australian. Just four players qualified for the match play, which was at Royal Sydney. Michael Scott qualified second and went on to win the championship. From 1910 the format returned to an earlier format with 8 players qualifying the 36-hole stroke play. Scott retained his title, beating Claude Felstead 4&3 in the final. O'Brien won for the third time in 1911, while Eric Apperly won for the first time in 1912. Apperly reached the final again in 1913 but lost to Walter Sturrock, a recent arrival from Scotland. Jim Howden won in 1914, beating Tom Howard in the final.

After World War I the format remained the same until 1926, when the number of qualifiers was increased from 8 to 16. Tom Howard, the 1914 runner-up won the event in 1919 and 1921 before turning professional. Eric Apperly, who had won in 1912, won the championship four more times between 1920 and 1930. Henry McClelland and Harry Sinclair each reached three final in the 1920s, winning once each. Sinclair, like Howard, would have a successive professional career. Ivo Whitton, from Victoria, who won the Australian Open five times, became the champion in 1929.

In 1931 the stroke-play qualifying was dropped and the event was match-play only, early rounds being over 18 holes. In 1936 the 36-hole qualifying was reintroduced but with 32 qualifiers, all match-play rounds being over 36 holes. Jim Ferrier won in 1931, as a 16-year-old, and won three more times in the 1930s. Harry Hattersley won twice, in 1933 and 1935, and was also runner-up twice. Alan Waterson won the first time in 1939, beating Ferrier in the final and won again in 1940.

When the championship resumed in 1946, defending champion Alan Waterson lost in the semi-final to the eventual winner, Kep Enderby. However Waterson won again in 1947 and 1948, completing a run of four wins in five editions. Peter Heard had his only win in 1949 while Harry Hattersley had his third win in 1950, 15 years after his previous success. Keith Pix also won the championship three times, in 1951, 1952 and 1954. Harry Berwick was another multiple winner in the 1950s, winning in 1953 and 1955, and he also reached the final in 1958, losing to Bruce Devlin. Kevin Donohoe reached five successive finals from 1960 to 1964, winning twice, in 1962 and 1963. 1965 saw a success for Vic Bulgin, an ex-Rugby League player.

1968 saw the first major revision to the format since the 1930s. The qualifying was extended to 72 holes, becoming a separate event, the winner being the state medallist. At the same time the number of qualifiers was reduced to 16. Tony Gresham became the first medallist, finishing a stroke ahead of Barry Burgess. Gresham reached the final of the championship but lost 6&5 to Jack Newton. Gresham reached the final again in 1969, losing to Don Sharp, before winning in 1970, beating Barry Burgess in the final.

From 1971 the NSW Medal was generally played at a different venue to the amateur championship. In 1971 the number of qualifiers was increased again to 32. Harry Berwick won the championship for a third time, 16 years after his previous win. Two years later, in 1973, he won for the fourth time, with Tony Gresham winning for the second time in 1972. Colin Kaye won three times in four years, in 1974, 1976 and 1977, with Phil Wood another repeat winner, in 1975 and 1978. Gresham won for a third time in 1982 and he is the last repeat winner.

Winners

Additional source:

New South Wales Medal
When the first match-play championship was played in 1903 there was a 36-hole stroke-play qualifying stage. The same system was used in subsequent years, the exceptions being in 1908, when the qualifying was over 72 holes, and from 1931 to 1935, when the event was match-play only. In 1968 the stroke-play stage was extended to 72 holes and became a separate competition, the New South Wales Medal, although it continued to be used as qualification for the amateur championship. Initially the Medal was played immediately before the amateur championship, on the same course, but from 1971 the two were separated. In 1971 the Medal was played at Avondale, with the amateur played at the New South Wales club, starting three weeks later. In 2017 the event was reduced to 36 holes.

Winners

 2023 Chris Fan
 2022 Joshua Greer
 2021 Jeffrey Guan
 2020 Jediah Morgan
 2019 Joey Savoie
 2018 Nathan Barbieri
 2017 Travis Smyth
 2016 Jang Seung-bo
 2015 Cameron Davis
 2014 Curtis Luck
 2013 Tom Power Horan
 2012 Neil Raymond
 2011 Andy Sullivan
 2010 Michael Williams
 2009 Kyle Grant, Jason Scrivener, Lincoln Tighe
 2008 Rohan Blizard
 2007 Stephen Lewton
 2006 Won Joon Lee
 2005 Gary Wolstenholme
 2004 Richie Gallichan
 2003 Colm Moriarty
 2002 Kurt Barnes, Adam Groom
 2001 Ewan Porter
 2000 Jason King
 1999 Adam Groom, Andrew Partridge
 1998 David Gleeson, Mark Thomson, Graydon Woolridge
 1997 Brendan Jones
 1996 Scott Gardiner, Nathan Green, Brendan Jones
 1995 Stephen Allan
 1994 Ian Bradley
 1993 Chris Jones
 1992 Phil Tataurangi
 1991 Wayne Stewart
 1990 Steven Conran, Matthew Ecob
 1989 Robert Willis
 1988 Gerard Power
 1987 Chris Longley
 1986 Tony Gresham, Ray Picker
 1985 Peter O'Malley
 1984 Brad Lincoln, Ray Picker
 1983 Eric Couper
 1982 Gerard Power
 1981 Col Lindsay
 1980 Phil Aickin
 1979 Greg Bush
 1978 Tony Gresham
 1977 Tony Gresham
 1976 Tony Gresham
 1975 Phil Wood
 1974 Tony Gresham
 1973 Phil Wood
 1972 Tony Gresham
 1971 Noel Ratcliffe
 1970 Eric Couper
 1969 Noel Ratcliffe
 1968 Tony Gresham

Additional source:

See also
New South Wales Women's Amateur Championship
Australian Men's Interstate Teams Matches

References

External links

Amateur golf tournaments in Australia
Golf in New South Wales
Recurring sporting events established in 1898
1898 establishments in Australia